3F-PiHP (3F-α-PHiP) is a recreational designer drug from the substituted cathinone family, with stimulant effects. It was first identified in both Sweden and Finland in mid-2019, and was made illegal in Finland in August 2019.

See also
 3-Fluoromethcathinone
 3F-NEH
 3F-PVP
 4F-PHP
 α-PHiP
 α-PCyP
 Isohexylone

References 

Pyrrolidinophenones
Designer drugs
Serotonin-norepinephrine-dopamine releasing agents
Fluoroarenes